L. Marc Zell (born February 25, 1953) is an American-Israeli lawyer, chairman of Republicans Overseas Israel and a vice president of Republicans Overseas, Inc.

Early life
Marc Zell was born February 25, 1953. He earned an A.B. from Princeton University in Germanic Languages and Literature with a concentration in theoretical linguistics, in 1974, then graduated magna cum laude from the University of Maryland at Baltimore with a J.D., in 1977.

Career
After clerking at the Maryland Court of Appeals for a year (1977–1978), Zell joined Fried, Frank, Harris, Shriver & Kampelman as an associate (1978–1981). In 1986, he formed the law firm of Feith & Zell, P.C. with Douglas Feith, who later served as Undersecretary of Defense for Policy, from 2001 to 2005.

After Douglas Feith left law practice to work at the Pentagon in 2001; Zell partnered with Bernel Goldberg to form Zell, Goldberg & Co., with offices in Jerusalem and Tel Aviv, and affiliate offices in Washington, DC, Russia and Europe.

In 2003, he joined the Iraqi International Law Group, the first international law firm in Iraq, and is currently a partner in the multinational law firm of Zell, Aron & Co. in Jerusalem, Israel, with branches offices in the U.S., Europe and Asia. He is currently the chairman of the Executive Committee of Ariel University in Samaria.

Political views
In August 2017, Zell condemned counter-protesters at a gathering of hundreds of white supremacists in Charlottesville, Virginia. Zell blamed the counter-protesters for the violence at the gathering, stating that they represented the "ugly face of progressivism".

Personal life
In the 1980s, Zell developed an interest in Zionism and, after a series of visits to Israel, moved his family, in 1988, to the Israeli settlement of Alon Shvut in the West Bank. Since 2016, he lives in the Israeli settlement of Tekoa. He supported Donald Trump for President of the United States in 2016.

References

1953 births
Living people
American lawyers
University of Maryland, Baltimore alumni
American Zionists
Washington, D.C., Republicans
American emigrants to Israel
Princeton University alumni
Corporate lawyers
Intellectual property lawyers
Antitrust lawyers
Israeli settlers